Harikesa Das, formerly known as Harikesa Swami and by the honorific Vishnupada, born Robert Campagnola, was one of the leading disciples of A. C. Bhaktivedanta Swami Prabhupada and a guru within the International Society of Krishna Consciousness (commonly known as 'the International Society for Krishna Consciousness|Hare Krishnas' or ISKCON). He left ISKCON in 1998.

ISKCON

He personally met the founder of ISKCON, A.C. Bhaktivedanta Swami Prabhupada, in Brooklyn, while recording Prabhupada's music in July 1971. Harikesa Swami was initiated by Prabhupada in New York, July 1971, and given the name Harikesa dasa.

Zonal Acarya time
When the founder of the ISKCON religious movement left, the leadership of the faith was divided up on 11 of the most prominent disciples of the Guru, and Harikesa was one of them. The world was divided into 11different preaching zones, and the leader for each zone was called acarya. The zone of leadership for Harikesa was northern Europe, including Scandinavia, Germany, Switzerland and Austria, and the East European countries and the whole of the Soviet Union.

Under the leadership of Harikesa, the ISKCON faith was spread widely over all of his allotted zone, and the number of members and centres of ISKCON multiplied in the area.

The preaching efforts were dependent on having translation of the books written by the leader of the ISKCON movement, A.C. Bhaktivedanta Swami Prabhupada, and under the direction of Harikesa a new branch of the Bhaktivedanta Book Trust publishing house in Sweden, and collected around him new members of the ISKCON movement who could translate the collected books to their respective languages. This was the time before desktop publishing, and just in the beginning of photo typesetting. Harikesa lead a group of his followers to develop their own computerised desktop publishing computer equipment, to be able to produce all the different languages, which also included developing own phototypesetting fonts. With his idea, every new language got their own customised personal computer, which were transported or smuggled into the respective country, and the ready translated books were sent on diskettes to the publishing house central, where all the final steps of book production were performed. By this streamline production scheme, it was possible to produce a lot of titles of the ISKCON books, in a very short time, and with only a very lightweight core crew to do the actual book publishing work. This was practically speaking the invention of desktop publishing before its time.

By that work, soon the translated books of the ISKCON faith started coming to all the Soviet Union countries in their native language, which in turn initiated and caused the spread of the ISKCON religious movement in those countries.

Apart from leading this book publishing work, Harikesa was also the spiritual leader of his zone, and travelled a lot to the countries in his area to oversee the opening of new ISKCON centerers, accepting new disciples, and leading them into the ISKCON faith. 

Leadership of the Northern Europe branch of the BBT book publishing time continued all the time until 1998, upon which time it continued with the leadership of those of his former disciples who stayed in the ISKCON organisation.

COM System

As the publishing expanded, in the early 80s the BBT programmer, Prsni, suggested the creation of an internal conferencing system and a PDP-11 minicomputer system was purchased and a limited internal conferencing system, based on the popular KOM (BBS) system was installed. Soon it became apparent that the capacity to discuss the publishing affairs in conference format greatly increased the capacity of the BBT. Considering that Harikesa Swami was now travelling almost non-stop throughout an expanding area and engaging in publishing in dozens of languages, the system was enhanced to allow users to dial into the network from anywhere in the world. This system, renamed COM, connected all parts of ISKCON and the BBT in real-time, and was soon carrying hundreds of communications a day long before the creation of the www or the on-line usage of the internet. Harikesa Swami was instrumental in facilitating and organising this development from the first day. Later, as the system became larger with many thousands of users, programmers were brought in to create a user interface to allow desktop organisation of the texts in the conferences and personal mail.

Resignation from ISKCON

Harikesa collapsed due to stress and overwork in the summer 1998, after having accepted even more responsibilities in addition to those he already had. After that he decided to resign from all ISKCON duties, and of being a spiritual leader and guru in ISKCON, and instead to retire to a more personal sphere. His resignation was accepted by ISKCON's Governing Body Commission meetings in 1999.

Recording Artist
Harikesa dasa has been producing music that bridges the gap between classical music from Western culture and Eastern Mantra since 1978. Harikesa Swami has produced more than 28 albums (under the group names of Rasa, BLISS, Sri Hari and Siva Hari).

Bibliography 
 Harikesa Swami, Varnasrama Manifesto for Social Sanity, 1981, Bhaktivedanta Book Trust, . Edited by Devamrita Swami.
 Harikesa Swami, The Thirteenth Chapter, Bhaktivedanta Book Trust, 1985, 
 Harikesa Swami, The Krsna Conscious Handbook, Underground Soviet Publication during the Cold War, 1986
 Harikesa Swami, Basic Management Book for ISKCON Temples, ISKCON publication, 1989
 Harikesa Swami, Essential Truths – The Questions and Answers Conference 1989–1994, 1996, Sentient Press, 
 Harikesa Swami, All glories to the Sankirtana devotees, 1996, Sentient Press, 
 Harikesa Swami, On Social Issues, 1998, Sentient Press,
 Harikesa Swami, The Leadership and Management Seminar, 1998, Sentient Press, Video and Audio Cassette Packs

Discography

References

Living people
Former International Society for Krishna Consciousness religious figures
Converts to Hinduism
Performers of Hindu music
American Hare Krishnas
Year of birth missing (living people)